Latimojong is a village in Buntu Batu district, Enrekang Regency in South Sulawesi province. Its population is 2054.

Climate
Latimojong has a cold subtropical highland climate (Cfb) with moderate rainfall in September and October and heavy to very heavy rainfall in the remaining months.

References

Villages in South Sulawesi